Mauricio Ortiz (born 24 June 1986 in Argentina) is an Argentine retired footballer.

Career

At the age of 17, Ortiz played for Aarhus Gymnastikforening in the Danish top flight, scoring 1 goal in 2 appearances. However, his contract was not renewed due to his agents requesting too much money. After that, Ortiz played for Danish lower league sides Ølstykke, until they went bankrupt, and IF Skjold Birkerød.

In 2016, he played for Club Villa Mitre in the Argentine fourth division.

References

External links
 Mauricio Ortiz at Tipsbladet.dk

Argentine footballers
Living people
Association football midfielders
Association football forwards
1986 births
IF Skjold Birkerød players